Acraephnes nivea is a moth in the family Depressariidae. It was described by Alfred Jefferis Turner in 1947. It is found in Australia, where it has been recorded from Queensland and New South Wales.

The wingspan is 16–22 mm. The forewings and hindwings are white.

References

Moths described in 1947
Acraephnes
Taxa named by Alfred Jefferis Turner
Moths of Australia